James Decker may refer to:

 James A. Decker, the founder of the Decker Press
 James Decker, a character in the 2000 film Animal Factory